Roucy is a small commune in the Aisne department in Hauts-de-France in northern France. Notable features of this town include the wide central plaza on which village fetes occur every summer.

Population

See also
 Communes of the Aisne department

References

Communes of Aisne
Aisne communes articles needing translation from French Wikipedia